The Australian Computer Society (ACS) is an association for information and communications technology professionals with over 48,000 members Australia-wide.  According to its Constitution, its objectives are "to advance professional excellence in information technology" and "to promote the development of Australian information and communications technology resources".

The ACS was formed on 1 January 1966 from five state based societies. It was formally incorporated in the Australian Capital Territory on 3 October 1967. Since 1983 there have been chapters in every state and territory.

The ACS is a member of the Australian Council of Professions ("Professions Australia"), the peak body for professional associations in Australia. Internationally, ACS is a member of the International Professional Practice Partnership (IP3), South East Asia Regional Computer Confederation, International Federation for Information Processing and The Seoul Accord.

The ACS is also a member organisation of the Federation of Enterprise Architecture Professional Organizations (FEAPO), a worldwide association of professional organisations which have come together to provide a forum to standardise, professionalise, and otherwise advance the discipline of Enterprise Architecture.

Activities 

The ACS operates various chapters, annual conferences,
Special Interest Groups, and a professional development program. Members are required to comply with a Code of Ethics and a Code of Professional Conduct.

Extent of representation 
The ACS describes itself as "the professional association for Australia's technology sector" and "Australia's primary representative body for the ICT workforce", but industry analysts have questioned this based on the small percentage of IT professionals who are ACS members. The issue has been discussed in the press since at least 2004, and in 2013 the Sydney Morning Herald wrote that "the ACS aggressively seeks to control the important software engineering profession in Australia, but ... less than 5 per cent of the professional IT workforce belongs to the ACS." The ACS Foundation came up with a slightly higher figure: "Depending on the data used to calculate the number of ICT professionals in Australia, however, [ACS] membership represents approximately 6.5 per cent of the total."

Presidents 
The Australian Computer Society elects its National President every two years, who serves as the leader of the Society. Some of the most recent presidents include:
 Dr. Nick Tate, 2022 - 2023 
 Ian Opperman, 2020 - 2021 
 Yohan Ramasundarah, 2018 – 2019 
 Anthony Wong, 2016 – 2017 
 Brenda Aynsley, 2014 – 2016 
 Nick Tate, 2012 – 2014 
 Kumar Parakala, 2008 – 2010 
 Philip Argy, 2006 – 2008 
 Edward Mandla, 2004 – 2006

Young IT 
The Young IT Professionals Board of the Australian Computer Society provides a voice for young IT professionals and students, as well as a range of services and benefits for members. Currently Young IT organises and runs a bi-annual YIT International Conference and other events such as local career days, soft skills and technical seminars, networking opportunities and social events (e.g. Young IT in the Pub) in each of the Australian States.

The most recent Young IT Conference was held in Melbourne in 2014.

Publications 
Information Age is the official publication of the ACS. In February 2015 Information Age became an online-only publication. Peer-reviewed research publications of the ACS include:
 Journal of Research and Practice in Information Technology
 Conferences in Research and Practice in Information Technology
 Australasian Journal of Information Systems
The digital library contains free journal articles and conference papers.

Related organisations 

 Association for Computing Machinery
 ACS Foundation
 Australian Information Security Association
 British Computer Society
 Institution of Analysts and Programmers
 International Federation for Information Processing
 New Zealand Computer Society
 Computer Society of India
 Computer Society of Southern Africa
 Canadian Information Processing Society
 SEARCC
 Seoul Accord

Other Australian computer associations
 AUUG – Now deregistered
 Linux Australia
 LUGs in Australia
 SAGE-AU
 Institute of Analytics Professionals of Australia (IAPA), incorporating business data analytics, business intelligence, data mining and related industries
 Australian Software Innovation Forum, encourages collaboration and co-operation in Java EE and associated technologies

Special Interest Groups 

Special Interest Groups (SIGs) of the ACS are connected to each state branch with some SIGs of the same or similar name occurring in a number of states, depending on local interest, and include: Architects, Software Quality Assurance, Women in Technology, Business Requirements Analysis, Enterprise Capacity Management, Enterprise Solution Development, Free Open Source Software, Information Security, IT Management, Project Management, Service Oriented Computing, Web Services, Consultants and Contractors, IT Security, PC Recycling, Curry SIG, Information Technology in Education, Robotics, E-Commerce, IT Governance, Software Engineering and Cloud Computing. A recent addition is the Green ICT Group on computers and telecommunications for environmental sustainability. In 2007 the Telecommunications Society of Australia was absorbed into the Australian Computer Society as the Telecommunications Special Interest Group

Education and Certification 

The ACS runs the online Computer Professional Education Program (CPEP) for postgraduate education in subjects including: Green ICT Strategies; New Technology Alignment; Business, Strategy & IT; Adaptive Business Intelligence; Project Management; Managing Technology and Operations. CPEP uses the Australian developed Moodle course management system and is delivered via the web.

The Diploma of Information Technology (DIT) is equivalent to one academic year of a Bachelor of Information Technology at several universities. It has eight compulsory subjects: systems analysis, programming, computer organisation, data management, OO systems development, computer communications, professional practice and systems principles.

The ACS also certifies IT professionals at two levels, the Certified Professional and the Certified Technologist.  Each certification level has a minimum level of experience and also required ongoing CPD (Certified Professional Development) hours of learning each year. In 2017 the ACS launched a cybersecurity specialisation within the certification framework.

Digital Disruptors Awards 
ACS recognizes outstanding technical talent in the Australian industry with seven "ACS Digital Disruptors awards". They are:

Individual Awards

 ICT Professional of the Year
 Emerging ICT Professional of the Year (Age under 30)
 CXO Disruptor of the Year

Team/Project Awards

 Service Transformation for the Digital Consumer
 Skills Transformation of Work Teams
 Best New Tech Platform
 ICT Research Project of the Year

See also 
 Skills Framework for the Information Age

References

Citations

Sources 

 "The Australian Computer Society". Retrieved 16 May 2006.
 "ACS Historical Notes". Retrieved 16 May 2006.
 ACS Code of Professional Conduct and Professional Practice

External links
  of the ACS
 ACS Foundation
 Information Age

Professional associations based in Australia
Information technology organizations based in Oceania
Organizations established in 1966
1966 establishments in Australia